Cotula mexicana, also known as Mexican brassbuttons, is a plant species in the sunflower family. It is widespread in South America and also found in central Mexico (Puebla, México State, Hidalgo) and parts of the United States (California, Idaho).

References

mexicana
Flora of South America
Flora of North America
Plants described in 1838